Areꞌare was a single-member constituency of the Governing Council and Legislative Assembly of the Solomon Islands. Created in 1973 when the Governing Council was expanded from 17 to 24 seats, it was located on the island of Malaita. In the 1973 elections the seat was won by David Kausimae, who had been elected in the South Central Malaita constituency in the 1970 elections, defeating Peter Kenilorea. It was abolished in 1976 and succeeded by East ꞌAreꞌare (which was won by Kenilorea, who went on to be appointed the Islands' first Chief Minister) and West ꞌAreꞌare (in which Kausimae was elected).

List of MPs

Election results

1973

References

Governing Council of the Solomon Islands constituencies
Legislative Assembly of the Solomon Islands constituencies
1973 establishments in the Solomon Islands
Constituencies established in 1973
1976 disestablishments in the Solomon Islands
Constituencies disestablished in 1976